As of 1946 most of the Finnish newspapers were affiliated with political parties. The number of national daily newspapers in Finland was 64 in 1950, whereas it was 56 in 1965. In 1990 there were 252 newspapers in the country. In 2008 the number was 197. It rose to 324 titles in 2012, but there was a decrease by 10% between 2006 and 2012.

Below is a list of newspapers in Finland with their respective cities of publication:

Finnish-language newspapers

Morning newspapers
Aamulehti (Tampere)
Aamuposti (Riihimäki, Hyvinkää, Loppi, Hausjärvi)
Demokraatti (Helsinki)
Etelä-Saimaa (Lappeenranta)
Etelä-Suomen Sanomat (Lahti)
Hämeen Sanomat (Hämeenlinna)
Helsingin Sanomat (Helsinki)
IIkka (Seinäjoki)
Itä-Häme (Heinola)
Kainuun Sanomat (Kainuu)
Kaleva (Oulu)
Kansan Uutiset (Helsinki)
Karjalainen (Joensuu)
Kauppalehti (Helsinki)
Keskipohjanmaa (Kokkola)
Keskisuomalainen (Jyväskylä)
Kouvolan Sanomat (Kouvola)
Kymen Sanomat (Kotka)
Länsi-Savo (Mikkeli)
Länsi-Suomi (Rauma)
Lapin Kansa (Rovaniemi)
Pohjalainen (Vaasa)
Salon Seudun Sanomat (Salo)
Satakunnan Kansa (Pori)
Savon Sanomat (Kuopio)
Taloussanomat (Helsinki)
Turun Sanomat (Turku)
Uusimaa (Porvoo)

"Evening" newspapers (tabloid)
Ilta-Sanomat (Helsinki), founded in 1932
Iltalehti (Helsinki), founded in 1980

Regional newspapers
Keskilaakso (Anjalankoski)
Etelä-Saimaa (Lappeenranta)
Etelä-Suomen Sanomat (Lahti)
Hyvinkään Sanomat (Hyvinkää)
 (Iisalmi)
Itä-Savo (Savonlinna)
Kainuun Sanomat (Kajaani)
 (Pohjois-Karjala)
Karjalan Maa (Pohjois-Karjala)
Kouvolan Sanomat (Kouvola)
 (Lohja) 
 (Helsinki)
Oulunsalo (Oulunsalo)
  Tyrvään Sanomat
Uutislehti 100 (Helsinki; defunct)

Swedish-language newspapers
Åbo Underrättelser (Turku)
Ålandstidningen (Mariehamn)
Borgåbladet (Porvoo)
Hufvudstadsbladet (Helsinki)
Nya Åland (Mariehamn)
Österbottens Tidning (Kokkola)
Östra Nyland (Loviisa)
Saima (Turku)
Syd-Österbotten (Närpes)
Vasabladet (Vaasa)
Västra Nyland (Raseborg)

English-language newspapers
Daily Finland www.dailyfinland.fi (Rovaniemi)
Helsinki Times (Helsinki)
News Now Finland www.newsnowfinland.fi

Most valuable brands
Markkinointi & Mainonta business magazine and  have researched the value of the newspapers' brands since 2007.

Most valuable newspaper brands in Finland as of 2009
Aamulehti
Etelä-Suomen Sanomat
Helsingin Sanomat
Hufvudstadsbladet
Iltalehti
Ilta-Sanomat
Kaleva
Karjalainen
Kauppalehti
Keskisuomalainen
Maaseudun Tulevaisuus
Savon Sanomat
Taloussanomat
Turun Sanomat

See also
 List of Finnish magazines
 Mass media in Finland

References

Finland
List
Newspapers